Ysaline Bonaventure was the defending champion, but chose not to participate.

Harmony Tan won the title, defeating Jaqueline Cristian in the final, 3–6, 6–2, 6–1.

Seeds

Draw

Finals

Top half

Bottom half

References

Main Draw

Engie Open Andrézieux-Bouthéon 42 - 1